The 1920 Richmond Spiders football team was an American football team that represented the University of Richmond as a member of the South Atlantic Intercollegiate Athletic Association (SAIAA) during the 1920 college football season. Led by seventh-year head coach, Frank Dobson, Richmond compiled an overall record of 6–2 with a mark of 2–2 in conference play. Next season's schedule was expected to be its "heaviest."

Schedule

References

Richmond
Richmond Spiders football seasons
Richmond Spiders football